Kumargram  is a village in the Kumargram CD block in the Alipurduar subdivision of the Alipurduar district  in the state of West Bengal, India. Nearest Town Kamakhyaguri

Geography

Location

Area overview
Alipurduar district is covered by two maps. It is an extensive area in the eastern end of the Dooars in West Bengal. It is undulating country, largely forested, with numerous rivers flowing down from the outer ranges of the Himalayas in Bhutan. It is a predominantly rural area with 79.38% of the population living in the rural areas. The district has 1 municipal town and 20 census towns and that means that 20.62% of the population lives in the urban areas. The scheduled castes and scheduled tribes, taken together, form more than half the population in all the six community development blocks in the district. There is a high concentration of tribal people (scheduled tribes) in the three northern blocks of the district.

Note: The map alongside presents some of the notable locations in the subdivision. All places marked in the map are linked in the larger full screen map.

Civic administration

Police station
Kumagram police station has jurisdiction over a part of the Kumargram CD block.

CD block HQ
Headquarters of Kumargram CD block is at Kumargram.

Demographics
According to the 2011 Census of India, Kumargram had a total population of 5,384 of which 2,785 (52%) were males and 2,599 (50%) were females. There were 545 persons in the age range of 0 to 6 years. The total number of literate people in Kumargram was 3,742 (77.33% of the population over 6 years).

Healthcare
There is a  primary health centre, with 6 beds at Kumargram.

References

Villages in Alipurduar district